Clean Monday (Kathara Deftera), also known as Pure Monday, Ash Monday, Monday of Lent or Green Monday, is the first day of Great Lent throughout Eastern Christianity and is a moveable feast, falling on the sixth Monday before Palm Sunday which begins Holy Week, preceding Pascha Sunday (Easter).

The common term for this day, "Clean Monday", refers to the leaving behind of sinful attitudes and non-fasting foods. It is sometimes called "Ash Monday", by analogy with Ash Wednesday (the first day of Lent in Western Christianity). The term is often a misnomer, as only a small subset of Eastern Catholic Churches practice the imposition of ashes. The Maronite, Chaldean  and the Syro-Malabar Catholic Churches are notable amongst the Eastern rites employing the use of ashes on this day.

Date 
Clean Monday is part of the paschal cycle, and as such it depends on the paschal computus which may differ between denominations and churches. Additionally, the date may also depend on the calendar used by the particular church, such as the (revised) Julian calendar used by Eastern Orthodox churches, the Gregorian calendar used by Eastern Catholics, and the Ethiopian or Coptic calendars traditionally used by some Oriental Orthodox churches.

Liturgical aspects 
Liturgically, Clean Monday—and thus Lent itself—begins on the preceding (Sunday) night, at a special service called Forgiveness Vespers, which culminates with the Ceremony of Mutual Forgiveness, at which all present will bow down before one another and ask forgiveness. In this way, the faithful begin Lent with a clean conscience, with forgiveness, and with renewed Christian love. The entire first week of Great Lent is often referred to as "Clean Week", and it is customary to go to Confession during this week, and to clean the house thoroughly.

The theme of Clean Monday is set by the Old Testament reading appointed to be read at the Sixth Hour on this day, which says, in part:

Traditionally, it is considered to mark the beginning of the spring season, a notion which was used symbolically in Ivan Bunin's critically acclaimed story, Pure Monday. The happy, springtime atmosphere of Clean Monday may seem at odds with the Lenten spirit of repentance and self-control, but this seeming contradiction is a marked aspect of the Orthodox approach to fasting, in accordance with the Gospel lesson read on the morning before, which admonishes:

In this manner, the Orthodox celebrate the fact that "the springtime of the Fast has dawned, the flower of repentance has begun to open".

Observances 

Eating meat, eggs and dairy products is traditionally forbidden to Orthodox Christians throughout Lent, which begins with Clean Monday. Fish is eaten only on major feast days, but shellfish is permitted in European denominations. This has created the tradition of eating elaborate dishes based on seafood (shellfish, molluscs, fish roe etc.).

Clean Monday is a public holiday in Greece and Cyprus, where it is celebrated with outdoor excursions, the consumption of shellfish and other fasting food, a special kind of azyme bread, baked only on that day, named "lagana" and the widespread custom of flying kites, as it symbolises "trying to reach the Divine".

See also
Maslenitsa
Shrove Monday
Shrove Tuesday

Notes

References

External links
Monks on Mount Athos performing the Ceremony of Forgiveness
Forgiveness Vespers St. Innocent Cathedral, Anchorage, Alaska
Greek Lagana (λαγάνα) bread recipe 
Clean Monday at OrthodoxWiki.org

Monday
Eastern Orthodox liturgical days
Greek culture
Cypriot culture
Kite festivals
Holidays based on the date of Easter
February observances
March observances
Lent

mk:Прочка